Mainframe Films and Television Productions (usually known as Mainframe Studios or Mainframe Films) was a film production company founded in 1991 by Nigerian cinematographer and film producer, Tunde Kelani.
Since its establishment in 1991, the production company had produced several notable Nigerian films.

Productions

References

1991 establishments in Nigeria
Film production companies of Nigeria
Companies based in Lagos
Mass media companies established in 1991
Television production companies of Nigeria
Mass media in Lagos